Chaudhry Khalid Javaid Warraich (born 1 May 1962) is a Pakistani politician who has been a member of the National Assembly of Pakistan, since August 2018. Previously, he was a member of the National Assembly from June 2013 to May 2018 and was a Member of the Provincial Assembly of the Punjab from 1993 to 1999.

Early life
He was born on 1 May 1962. He is a good man.

Political career

He ran for the seat of the Provincial Assembly of the Punjab as an independent candidate for Constituency PP-76 (Toba Tek Singh) in 1988 Pakistani general election but was unsuccessful. He received 16,965 votes and lost the seat to Muhammad Khalid Malik, a candidate of Pakistan Peoples Party (PPP).

He was elected to the Provincial Assembly of the Punjab as an independent candidate for Constituency PP-76 (Toba Tek Singh) in 1993 Pakistani general election. He received 23,266 votes and defeated Chaudhry Zafar Iqbal, a candidate of Pakistan Muslim League (N) (PML-N). During his tenure as Member of the Punjab Assembly, he served as Parliamentary Secretary for Communication and Works.

He was re-elected to the Provincial Assembly of the Punjab as an independent candidate for Constituency PP-76 (Toba Tek Singh) in 1997 Pakistani general election. He received 21,602 votes and defeated Muzaffar Ahmad Cheema, a candidate of PML-N.

He ran for the seat of the Provincial Assembly of the Punjab as a candidate of PML-N for Constituency PP-90 (Toba Tek Singh-VII) in 2002 Pakistani general election but was unsuccessful. He received 14,558 votes and lost the seat to an independent candidate, Liaquat Ali Shoukat.

He was elected to the National Assembly of Pakistan as a candidate for PML-N for Constituency NA-92 (Toba Tek Singh-I) in 2013 Pakistani general election. He received 91,903 votes and defeated an independent candidate, Usama Hamza.

He was re-elected to the National Assembly as a candidate of PML-N from Constituency NA-111 (Toba Tek Singh-I) in 2018 Pakistani general election.

References

Living people
Pakistan Muslim League (N) politicians
Punjabi people
Pakistani MNAs 2013–2018
1962 births
Punjab MPAs 1993–1996
Punjab MPAs 1997–1999
Pakistani MNAs 2018–2023